Raoni (also known as Raoni: The Fight for the Amazon) is a 1978 French-Belgian documentary film directed by Jean-Pierre Dutilleux and Luiz Carlos Saldanha on the life of Raoni Metuktire. The film portrays issues surrounding the survival of the indigenous tribes of north central Brazil. It was nominated for an Academy Award for Best Documentary Feature.

Actors 
The actors who played in this movie were Marlon Brando, Clive Kelly, Jacques Perrin, Paulo César Pereio, Raoni and Cláudio Villas Boas.

See also
 Raoni Metuktire
 Marlon Brando filmography

References

External links

1978 films
1978 documentary films
1970s English-language films
French documentary films
French independent films
Anthropology documentary films
Belgian documentary films
Belgian independent films
1978 independent films
English-language French films
English-language Belgian films
1970s French films